Work in compressed air, compressed air work or hyperbaric work is occupational activity in an enclosed atmosphere at a controlled ambient pressure significantly higher than the adjacent normal atmospheric pressure. There are many parallels with underwater diving, and a few significant differences.

Applications
Compressed air work is mostly used in civil engineering projects where a raised ambient pressure is used to counteract ingress of groundwater from the surrounding soil or rock by balancing the hydrostatic pressure of the water with an applied air pressure inside an enclosed and sealed working area, such as a caisson, shaft, or tunnel.

Classes

Compressed air work may be categorised as "low pressure", where staged decompression is not required regardless of exposure time (gauge pressure below 0.7 bar), "intermediate pressures" requiring stage decompression, but below the statutory limit, and "high pressure" where the ambient pressure is above the statutory limit (gauge pressure more than 3.5 bar in the UK – the limit may vary according to national legislation).

Physiology of hyperbaric exposure

The major physiological differences between compressed air work and underwater diving are associated with the air environment in compressed air work and the water immersion of diving operations. This reduces risk as drowning is unlikely, other environmental hazards of hypothermia and hyperthermia are more easily managed, and the worker is not encumbered by a diving suit and helmet, though other personal protective equipment appropriate to the worksite is usually necessary, and the risk of fire may be higher. There is also often a significant difference in the numbers of personnel exposed in the hyperbaric working area. In diving it is seldom more than three, while in compressed air work there may be more.

Decompression

Decompression at the end of a shift is usually done in an airlock between the hyperbaric working area and the outside environment, and may routinely use pure oxygen as a breathing gas to accelerate decompression. Decompression schedules have been developed specifically for compressed air work, but other schedules of acceptable safety record may be used.

Saturation hyperbaric work

When the pressure of the workplace is relatively high, decompression at the end of a shift can take an uneconomically long time and exposes the worker to daily risk. In these cases it may be both economically preferable and reduce the overall risk to the workers to resort to saturation exposures, in which the workers remain under pressure for a tour of duty which may be for several days or weeks, and are decompressed conservatively just once at the end. In this scenario hyperbaric living quarters and the staff to operate them are needed, but full shifts can be worked. Transportation under pressure in a hyperbaric shuttle vehicle will usually be necessary to transfer workers between the accommodation and the workplace.

Health and safety
Compressed air work is generally considered a potentially hazardous occupational environment, and may be regulated accordingly. In some jurisdictions legislation mag be specific to compressed air work, while in others it may be combined with diving regulations.

Medical aspects

Legislation may require medical screening for candidate compressed air workers, similar to that for diving, and medical surveillance may be required for compressed air workers during and after exposure. Short term health risks include decompression sickness, barotraumas of compression and decompression, and long term risks include dysbaric osteonecrosis.

Management of decompression sickness

The risk of decompression sickness cannot be entirely eliminated within reasonably practicable procedures, and the contractor is generally obliged to provide emergency recompression facilities on site so that any cases or suspected cases of decompression sickness can be expeditiously treated.

References

Occupational safety and health